David Lang (16 August 1852) was a Scotland international rugby union player. He played at the Forward position.

Rugby Union career

Amateur career

Lang played for the rugby union arm of the Paisley Football and Shinty Club, known as Paisley Football Club

Provincial career

He was one of three Paisley players that made the West of Scotland District side to play the East of Scotland District on 26 February 1876. He played for the West side again in the same fixture on 9 February 1878.

He made the Whites Trial side that played against the Blues Trial side on 16 February 1878.

International career

Lang was capped by Scotland twice, in the period 1876 to 1877.

Family

He was the son of Robert Howard Lang and Jane Reid. He had brothers James, Howard and Robert; sisters Helen, Mary, Jane; and a half-sister Isabella. He married Margaret Galt and they had 5 children: Robert, John, Jean, David and Helen.

Outside of rugby union

He became a dyer of fabrics in Paisley's cotton trade.

Emigration

He emigrated to the United States and became a naturalised citizen in 1917 in Suffolk, New York.

References

1852 births
Rugby union players from Paisley, Renfrewshire
Scottish rugby union players
Scotland international rugby union players
West of Scotland District (rugby union) players
Whites Trial players
Paisley Football Club players
Year of death missing
Rugby union forwards